1999 Malta Open is a darts tournament, which took place in Malta in 1999.

Results

References

1999 in darts
1999 in Maltese sport
Darts in Malta